Einar Vilhjálmsson (born 1 June 1960 in Reykjavík) is a retired male javelin thrower from Iceland, who represented his native country at three consecutive Summer Olympics, starting in 1984. He set his personal best (86.80 metres) on 30 August 1992 in his native town Reykjavík. His father Vilhjálmur Einarsson finished in second place in the men's triple jump at the 1956 Summer Olympics.

In September 2014, he was elected president of the Icelandic Athletic Federation (Frjálsíþróttasamband Íslands).

Achievements

References

External links
 
 
 
 Year Ranking

1960 births
Living people
Einar Vilhjalmsson
Athletes (track and field) at the 1984 Summer Olympics
Athletes (track and field) at the 1988 Summer Olympics
Athletes (track and field) at the 1992 Summer Olympics
Einar Vilhjalmsson
Einar Vilhjalmsson
Texas Longhorns men's track and field athletes